Ana Gertrudis de Urrutia Garchitorena (1812 Cádiz - 5 November 1850 ) was a 19th century Spanish painter. She was a member of the Academy of Fine Arts in Cádiz, appointed on December 9, 1846.

Life 
She was the daughter of Tomás de Urrutia and Ana Garchitorena, and sister of Francisco Javier de Urrutia. 

As a painter she stood out in the historical and religious genre.  Her works show a style of neoclassical roots , influenced by Murillo .  

She married Juan José de Urmeneta , also a painter, who was a professor of painting and sculpture and came to hold the position of director of the Cadiz Academy of Fine Arts. 

She made a considerable number of oil paintings that were publicly exhibited in Cádiz. Among her works are San Jerónimo \, which she gave to the Cathedral of Cádiz; Saint Philomena; The Resurrection of the Flesh , an oil painting known as El Juicio , which was exhibited in Cádiz in 1846; The stigmatization of San Francisco , executed in 1841, found in the Cathedral Museum of Cádiz; and Portrait of Don Joaquín Fonsdeviela, which she donated to the Academy in 1847 and which can be seen in the Museum of Cádiz. She exhibited at the Exposición Nacional of 1846.

References 

1812 births
1850 deaths
Spanish artists
Spanish painters